Wild Youth is a lost 1918 American silent drama film directed by George Melford and written by Beulah Marie Dix. The film stars Louise Huff, Theodore Roberts, Jack Mulhall, James Cruze, and Adele Farrington. It is based on a novel by Gilbert Parker. The film was released on March 18, 1918, by Paramount Pictures. It is not known whether the film currently survives, which suggests that it is a lost film.

Plot
Forced to marry the elderly and narrow-minded Joel Mazarine, Louise lives unhappy and mistreated until she meets the young Orlando. Her husband, jealous, sees love blossom between the two young when Orlando remains at his ranch to recover from a wound of the bullet. Louise remained in the woods because of a fall from her horse, she can not return home because Mazarine Orlando is on charges of kidnapping her. Orlando, who finds her, takes her back to the ranch but Mazarine was furious and beats his wife mercilessly. The woman is saved by the intervention of faithful Li Choo, his Chinese servant, who kills Mazarine.

Of the crime, he accused Orlando. The confession of Li Choo exonerates him. Louise and Orlando are now free to marry.

Cast
Louise Huff as Louise Mazarine
Theodore Roberts as Joel Mazarine
Jack Mulhall as Orlando Guise
James Cruze as Li Choo
Adele Farrington as Orlando's Mother
Charles Ogle as Doctor

Reception
Like many American films of the time, Wild Youth was subject to cuts by city and state film censorship boards. For example, the Chicago Board of Censors cut, in Reel 2, two shootings by outlaws.

References

External links 
 

1918 films
1910s English-language films
Silent American drama films
1918 drama films
Paramount Pictures films
Lost American films
Films based on works by Gilbert Parker
Films directed by George Melford
American black-and-white films
American silent feature films
Films based on Canadian novels
1918 lost films
Lost drama films
1910s American films